The United Nations Educational, Scientific and Cultural Organization (UNESCO) World Heritage Sites are places of importance to cultural or natural heritage as described in the UNESCO World Heritage Convention, established in 1972. Cultural heritage consists of monuments (such as architectural works, monumental sculptures, or inscriptions), groups of buildings, and sites (including archaeological sites). Natural features (consisting of physical and biological formations), geological and physiographical formations (including habitats of threatened species of animals and plants), and natural sites which are important from the point of view of science, conservation or natural beauty, are defined as natural heritage. Pakistan accepted the convention on 23 July 1976, making its sites eligible for inclusion on the list.

, there are six World Heritage Sites in Pakistan, and a further 26 on the tentative list. The first three sites were listed in 1980, the Archaeological Ruins at Moenjodaro, Buddhist Ruins of Takht-i-Bahi and Neighbouring City Remains at Sahr-i-Bahlol, and Taxila. Two sites were listed in 1981 and the most recent site added to the list was the Rohtas Fort, in 1997. All six sites are cultural.

World Heritage Sites
UNESCO lists sites under ten criteria; each entry must meet at least one of the criteria. Criteria i through vi are cultural, and vii through x are natural.

Tentative list 

In addition to sites inscribed on the World Heritage List, member states can maintain a list of tentative sites that they may consider for nomination. Nominations for the World Heritage List are only accepted if the site was previously listed on the tentative list. , Pakistan has listed 26 properties on its tentative list.

See also
Cultural heritage in Pakistan
List of parks and gardens in Pakistan
List of forts in Pakistan
List of museums in Pakistan

References

External links

 
World Heritage Sites
Pakistan
World Heritage Sites